Voltage-gated hydrogen channel 1 is a protein that in humans is encoded by the HVCN1 gene.

Voltage-gated hydrogen channel 1 is a voltage-gated proton channel that has been shown to allow proton transport into phagosomes and out of many types of cells including  spermatozoa, electrically excitable cells and respiratory epithelial cells. The proton-conducting HVCN1 channel has only transmembrane domains corresponding to the S1-S4 voltage sensing domains (VSD) of voltage-gated potassium channels and voltage-gated sodium channels. Molecular simulation is consistent with a water-filled pore that can function as a "water wire" for allowing hydrogen bonded H+ to cross the membrane. However, mutation of Asp112 in human Hv1 results in anion permeation, suggesting that obligatory protonation of Asp produces proton selectivity. Quantum mechanical calculations show that the Asp-Arg interaction can produce proton selective permeation. The HVCN1 protein has been shown to exist as a dimer with two functioning pores. Like other VSD channels, HVCN1 channels conduct ions about 1000-fold slower than channels formed by tetrameric S5-S6 central pores.

As a drug target 

Small molecule inhibitors of the HVCN1 channel are being developed as chemotherapeutics and anti-inflammatory agents.

References

Further reading

Ion channels